Andrew Raymond Taylor (born August 18, 1986) is an American former professional baseball pitcher. He has played in Major League Baseball for the Los Angeles Angels.

Professional career

Los Angeles Angels
Taylor was drafted by the Los Angeles Angels of Anaheim in the 34th round of the 2008 Major League Baseball Draft out of North Carolina State University.

Taylor was called up to the majors for the first time on September 1, 2012.

Taylor was outrighted off the Angels roster on October 8, 2013. He was released on March 12, 2014.

Independent Leagues
In 2014, Taylor played with the Rockland Boulders of the Can-Am League. In 2015, Taylor stayed in the Can-Am League for the Trois-Rivières Aigles. On March 2, 2016, Taylor signed with the independent Wichita Wingnuts of the American Association of Independent Professional Baseball. He has not played professionally since.

References

External links

NC State Wolfpack bio

1986 births
Living people
Los Angeles Angels players
NC State Wolfpack baseball players
Orem Owlz players
Cedar Rapids Kernels players
Rancho Cucamonga Quakes players
Arkansas Travelers players
Salt Lake Bees players
Rockland Boulders players
Sportspeople from Durham, North Carolina
Baseball players from North Carolina